Music hall is a form of British theatre.

Music Hall may also refer to:

United Kingdom
The Music Hall (Aberdeen), Scotland
Music Hall, Shrewsbury

United States
Music Hall Center for the Performing Arts, Detroit, Michigan
The Music Hall (Portsmouth), New Hampshire
Music Hall (Clinton, New Jersey)
Music Hall (Tarrytown, New York)
Vail-Leavitt Music Hall, Riverhead, New York
Music Hall (Cincinnati), Ohio
Houston Music Hall, Houston, Texas
Music Hall (Boston), Massachusetts
Cohoes Music Hall, Cohoes, New York

Other countries
The Music Hall (Sydney theatre), a former theatre-restaurant in Australia
The Music Hall (Toronto), Canada
Music Hall (Hanover), Germany
MusicHall (Beirut), Lebanon

Other uses
Music Hall (film), a 1934 British musical drama film

See also

Radio City Music Hall, New York City, New York